The Bishop of Edmonton is an episcopal title used by an area bishop of the Church of England Diocese of London in the Province of Canterbury, England. The title takes its name after Edmonton, an area in the North of the London Borough of Enfield; the See was erected under the Suffragans Nomination Act 1888 by Order in Council dated 29 May 1970.

The See was erected in order to take oversight of a new fourth suffragan area (initially the deaneries of North and South Camden, Central and West Barnet, East and West Haringey, and Enfield) created by the diocese's 1970 experimental area scheme; bishops suffragan of Edmonton have been area bishops since the London area scheme was founded in 1979. On 9 July 2015, it was announced that Rob Wickham was to become the next area bishop from his consecration on 23 September of that year.

The episcopal title of "Bishop of Edmonton" is one of three that are duplicated in the Anglican Communion. The other Bishop of Edmonton is a diocesan bishop in Canada.

List of bishops

References

External links
 Crockford's Clerical Directory listings

 
Edmonton
Christianity in London